Mark 20 may refer to:

 The Mark 20 nuclear bomb, a planned successor to the Mark 13 nuclear bomb, but never built
 Mark 20 torpedo, an experimental 1943 US torpedo abandoned in testing after about 20 units had been built
 Mark 20 Bidder, a British torpedo in service 1955-1980s